On 6 October 2010. a Mil Mi-8 military helicopter from the Tajik National Guard crashed in the Rasht Valley close to Ezgand and Tavildara, Tajikistan, killing all 28 people on board. The helicopter became caught in power lines and crashed while attempting to land. It was the deadliest accident in Tajik aviation since 1997.

References 

Aviation accidents and incidents in 2010
Aviation accidents and incidents in Tajikistan
Accidents and incidents involving the Mil Mi-8
Accidents and incidents involving military aircraft
2010 in Tajikistan
October 2010 events in Asia
National Guard of Tajikistan
2010 disasters in Tajikistan